Greenwich Village Story, a 1963 feature film written and directed by Jack O'Connell, centres on the bohemian milieu of Greenwich Village. The female protagonist, Genie (played by actress Melinda Cordell, credited here as Melinda Plank), a talented ballet dancer, is made pregnant out of wedlock by her underachieving boyfriend, Brian (played by Robert Hogan (actor)), a would-be novelist. Rather than leave him in order to take up a professional dancing role she has been offered which involves touring, Genie stays in the flat they share, but Brian, after the damning rejection of his novel by a publisher upon whose patronage he was depending, absents himself for several days with an ex-girlfriend, Anne (played by Sunja Svensen), a society woman several years older who inhabits the periphery of bohemia, sometimes in the company of a genial young advertising copywriter, George (played by James Cresson).

Not aware that Genie is pregnant, Brian has made their marriage conditional upon his success as a writer. Genie fears that Brian, who is emotionally immature (something noted by the publishers in their dismissal of his submitted novel), will reject her out of hand on learning about her pregnancy. One possible solution is for Genie to visit an illegal abortionist, having sold her late mother's brooch to raise the cash. Meanwhile, Brian is informally mentored in the ways of the world by a more cynical and experienced bohemian, Norman (played by James Frawley), and tempted into the world of Madison Avenue by George, with whom he has struck up a friendship.

While away in the Berkshires with Anne, whose advances he gently shuns, Brian, still unaware of Genie's true condition, comes to the realisation that he loves and wants to marry her. He hurriedly returns to Greenwich Village, but Genie proves difficult to trace there.

The film was shot on location in Greenwich Village and The Berkshires, including a nude swimming scene filmed on Lake Garfield, Massachusetts. According to the director, the sounds of motorboat engines in this sequence threatened to take over the scene's audio and were replaced in the final soundtrack by pre-recorded crickets. The director himself had earlier worked as second assistant director on Michelangelo Antonioni's L'Avventura (1960), while cinematographer Baird Bryant later worked as uncredited assistant to László Kovács on Easy Rider (1969), in which he was responsible for filming the LSD trip sequence in the cemetery in New Orleans.

External links

1963 films
1963 independent films
1963 romantic drama films
American black-and-white films
American independent films
American romantic drama films
Films set in Manhattan
Films set in Massachusetts
Films shot in Massachusetts
Films shot in New York City
American pregnancy films
1963 directorial debut films
1960s English-language films
1960s American films